Mutasa South is a constituency of the National Assembly of the Parliament of Zimbabwe, located in Manicaland Province. Its current MP since a 2022 by-election is Misheck Mugadza of ZANU–PF. The seat was previous represented by Regai Tsunga of the Movement for Democratic Change Alliance until he was recalled in 2021.

History 
Mutasa South is a constituency of Zimbabwe in the province of Manicaland. It is also the central area of the Manyika tribe.

In the 2005 general election the candidate of the ZANU–PF was declared the winner. This was in contrast to the fact that the candidate of the MDC polled an overall majority.

In 2008, the MDC-Tsvangirai candidate Misheck Kagurabadza won against the ZANU-PF candidate.

In the 2018 election, the constituency was won by Regai Tsunga of the Movement for Democratic Change Alliance. Tsunga was recalled from parliament on 17 March 2021 amid factional disputes within the MDC Alliance. In a 26 March 2022 by-election, Misheck Mugadza of ZANU–PF was elected to the seat.

References

Manicaland Province
Parliamentary constituencies in Zimbabwe